The 1997 California 500 presented by NAPA was the inaugural NASCAR Winston Cup Series stock car race held at California Speedway in Fontana, California. The race was the 15th in the 1997 NASCAR Winston Cup Series season. The race was won by Jeff Gordon of Hendrick Motorsports, who also led the most laps with 113. A crowd of 85,000 attended the race, the first race in southern California since 1988, when Riverside International Raceway held the Budweiser 400.

Background

The track's turns are banked from fourteen degrees, while the front stretch, the location of the finish line, is banked at eleven degrees. Unlike the front stretch, the backstraightaway is banked at three degrees.

Race
The national anthem was performed by 20th Century Fox Records recording artists Ambrosia, NAPA vice president Wayne Wells gave the command for drivers to start their engines, and track executive Les Richter was the grand marshal.

On lap 29, Hut Stricklin hit the turn four wall, and was later treated for abrasions. Later in the race, Greg Sacks hit the turn two wall. Much of the race was dominated by Jeff Gordon, who led the most laps with 113 laps, though heading into the final 16 laps Mark Martin was able to pass Gordon, but had to pit to refuel three laps later. On the final lap, Gordon ran out of fuel, and with Hendrick teammate Terry Labonte closing in, Gordon coasted across the finish line to beat Labonte by 1.074 seconds and claim his fifth victory of the season. Ricky Rudd, Ted Musgrave, Jimmy Spencer and Bobby Labonte closed out the top five.

Timeline
Section reference: 
 Start of race: Joe Nemechek officially began the event with the pole position.
 Lap 2: Wally Dallenbach, Jr. took over the lead from Joe Nemechek.
 Lap 8: Jeff Gordon took over the lead from Wally Dallenbach, Jr..
 Lap 31: Caution given out due to Hut Stricklin's crash, ended on lap 34.
 Lap 32: Brett Bodine took over the lead from Jeff Gordon.
 Lap 33: Ken Schrader took over the lead from Brett Bodine.
 Lap 41: Jeff Gordon took over the lead from Ken Schrader.
 Lap 71: Mark Martin took over the lead from Jeff Gordon.
 Lap 73: Jeff Gordon took over the lead from Mark Martin.
 Lap 78: Mark Martin took over the lead from Jeff Gordon.
 Lap 81: Jimmy Spencer took over the lead from Mark Martin.
 Lap 82: Ricky Craven took over the lead from Jimmy Spencer.
 Lap 85: Jeff Gordon took over the lead from Ricky Craven.
 Lap 94: Rick Mast's vehicle suffered from engine problems.
 Lap 96: Caution due to oil on the track, ended on lap 104.
 Lap 97: Dale Jarrett took over the lead from Jeff Gordon.
 Lap 141: Caution due to Greg Sacks spinning out on the track, ended on lap 146.
 Lap 142: Ricky Craven took over the lead from Dale Jarrett.
 Lap 146: Engine problems ended Dave Marcis' chances of winning the event.
 Lap 147: Ernie Irvan took over the lead from Ricky Craven.
 Lap 149: Caution due to Jerry Nadeau's accident, ended on lap 151.
 Lap 153: Dale Jarrett took over the lead from Ernie Irvan.
 Lap 157: Terry Labonte took over the lead from Dale Jarrett.
 Lap 173: Electrical issues brought Wally Dallenbach, Jr. race day to a halt.
 Lap 198: Jimmy Spencer took over the lead from Terry Labonte.
 Lap 201: Darrell Waltrip took over the lead from Jimmy Spencer.
 Lap 202: Ernie Irvan managed to blow his engine while racing at high speeds.
 Lap 203: Jeff Gordon took over the lead from Darrell Waltrip.
 Lap 206: Sterling Marlin's engine could not take any more high speed racing and suddenly quit.
 Lap 215: Geoffrey Bodine had engine problems in his vehicle that took him out of the race.
 Lap 219: Ken Schrader would be forced to exit the event because of engine troubles.
 Lap 234: Mark Martin took over the lead from Jeff Gordon.
 Lap 240: Jeff Gordon took over the lead from Mark Martin.
 Lap 241: Bill Elliott managed to run out of gas due to bad pit strategies.
 Finish: Jeff Gordon was officially declared the winner of the event.

Standings after the race

References

California 500
California 500
NASCAR races at Auto Club Speedway
June 1997 sports events in the United States